Louis Little may refer to:

 Lou Little (1893–1979), American football player and coach
 Louis M. Little (1878–1960), 11th Assistant to the Major General Commandant of the Marine Corps